The Berlin Botanic Garden and Botanical Museum is a botanical garden in the  locality of the borough of , Berlin, Germany. The garden is part of the Free University of Berlin.

The most well-known part of the garden is the Great Pavilion, and among its many tropical plants, it hosts giant bamboo. These include the glass Cactus Pavilion and the glass Pavilion Victoria; the latter features a collection of orchids, carnivorous plants and the giant white water lily Victoria amazonica.

The  is the largest in Germany and holds more than 3.5 million preserved specimens.

Description 
It was constructed between 1897 and 1910 under the guidance of architect Adolf Engler in order to present exotic plants returned from German colonies.

Today, the garden is part of the Free University of Berlin. The  is the largest herbarium in Germany and holds more than 3.5 million preserved specimens.

The complex consists of several buildings and glass-houses, such as the Cactus Pavilion and the Pavilion Victoria, which features a collection of orchids, carnivorous plants and the giant white water lily Victoria amazonica. The garden's open-air areas consist of  sorted by geographical origin, and the arboretum area totals .

The best-known part of the garden is the Great Pavilion. Among the many tropical plants it hosts giant bamboo.

History 

In the year 1573, during the time of Elector John George, the first noteworthy assembly of plants for the enlargement of the national collection was achieved under the leadership of the chief gardener at the kitchen garden of the Berlin City Palace, Desiderius Corbianus. Even if the expression "botanic garden" did not exist at that time, it was, in fact, the first such in Berlin. The existing Pleasure Garden has developed from this original one.

In 1679 at Potsdam Street, in the location of the present Kleistpark, a hops garden was laid out. It was used for the electoral brewery and as a fruit and kitchen garden. Carl Ludwig Willdenow made sure that the garden was assigned in 1809 to the Berlin Frederick William University. The garden developed worldwide into a recognised scientific botanic garden. 

Stimulus to move the garden occurred in 1888. There was a need to expand the plantings and set out an arboretum. Without a relocation, many of the old greenhouses would have needed to be reconstructed. The financial aspects of a move to the city periphery were of importance, and it was not possible to expand the old kitchen and herbal garden in the city centre.

Grounds and plants

Layout 
Adolf Engler designed the grounds of the gardens as a landscaped garden. The largest part of the grounds is covered by the geographical section  and the arboretum . The aim was to present the various continents and habitats as close to their natural surroundings as possible. The  (carp pond), a pool of moraines that was already on the grounds before the creation of the botanical gardens, was enlarged and extended by a second pond. This facilitates the showcasing of waterside plants. The southern and western part of the gardens are taken up by the arboretum, a comprehensive and methodical collection of native plants. The arboretum borders the ponds. Therefore, native waterside plants are also part of the collection.

The northwestern area of the gardens at one time featured a section of plants which were methodically sorted by their affinity. This section was destroyed by air strikes, artillery fire and fighting on the ground in 1945. It has since been rebuilt in a modified version. It now houses a compound for the system of herbaceous plants and one for medical plants. This compound has been built in the form of the human body with the plants placed in the positions of their healing properties. The  was especially important because it showcased all medical plants which grow outdoors.

Two morphological sections used to be situated east of the main path in the little free spaces between the buildings. Here, the water and marsh bed compound in Section II requires special mention. Two-hundred and sixty-two basins with water sprinkling and draining were built from cement concrete. A large water basin was heated for the tropical marsh flora. The entire compound still exists but has been left open after the since the installation of a bordering marsh and water plants garden. The old compound is now becoming a conservation area for native wild plants and a biotope.

Art 

  (1975), erected 1988, on the main path near the entrance Königin-Luise-Platz
 Memorial for Christian Konrad Sprengel (1916)
  (1920s), near the entrance 

Buildings

Pavilions 

Numerous outdoor installations offer the possibility to relax, study literature, or search for protection against the rain. Alfred  proved his comprehensive skills by matching the constructions to diverse styles as well as the botanical surroundings. Parts of these pavilions are connected to ornamental elements.

A Japanese arbour is situated in the centre of an ornamental garden named "Japanese Love", within the sector which represent the flora and fauna of East Asia.

The Arbour of Roses is situated in the centre of the arboretum. In this case  built a semi–circular building from basalt lava. Its style can be described as Romanesque. It is surrounded by wild roses which overgrow the arbour. These roses show their blossoms in front of the dark building. Nowadays an open hall which is suitable for lectures is situated in the systematic section within widely spread meadows. Engler and his students used to go there to hold lectures.

Water facilities 
To deliver the water, vapour pumps were added and supplied with heat by the heating station. The water was pumped directly to the mains system of the garden as well as to the  large water tower located behind the conservatories. The technology was updated to make the pumps operated by electricity. The deep well still ensures the water supply networks.

Heating facilities 
Special requirements were placed on the heating facility because of the variety of plants requiring different growing conditions. Continuous operation during night and summer was required for cultivation, so an independent heating facility with three warm water kettles and a boiler was built in the Botanical Garden.

The heating facilities had to meet the following challenges:
 provision of the heating systems with hot water steam and low pressure steam;
 supply of the greenhouses with water vapour for air humidification and tropical mist;
 supply of the nursery with warm water; and
 supply of the pumping station, the rainwater pressure pipe, the electrical lighting and the electrical working machines with energy.

The Botanical Garden was connected to the network of the district heating plant  on 13 September 1967. Since then it has been the main source for heating energy for the Botanical Garden. Its renovation has reduced the energy consumption levels significantly, and when complete, energy consumption levels will be reduced by one-fifth.

Bunker 

Access was through two entrances from the courtyard of the Botanical Garden. The bunker was used for storage of the file inventory and to protect staff during alerts. It was of an unusual layout and construction with only a few rooms and several long tunnels. There was a tunnel shield at the end of one tunnel that remained after construction of the bunker ended in 1944. After the end of World War II, the entrances to the bunker were blown up. Some of the corridors also had collapsed by then. Today, the construction serves as winter quarters for bats.

Museum and herbarium 

Between 1819 and 1838 the explorer, botanist and poet  worked as a curator of the herbarium. In 1879 the herbarium in the old botanical garden gained its own building and was able to present its collectors' items to the public. A year later a botanical teaching exhibition was introduced. This was the prequel to the Botanical Museum.

After its relocation in 1907 to  the museum gained a considerably bigger exhibition space on three floors. These were used for expanding exhibitions about geobotany and paleobotany.
The rebuilding began in 1957 after the destruction of buildings and many exhibits. At this time the museum had a surface area of only one floor. After the relocation of the herbarium and the library to the new east wing, the museum could be expanded. On 11 March 1991, the second floor was introduced. In 2004–2005 the first floor was reworked and redesigned. Now the museum is seen as an addition to the garden and presents botanic topics that are not in the garden, including the historical progress, the progress within a year, inner plant structures, enlarged micro-structures, spreading of species, plant products and the use of plants.

Cemetery 

From the access at the  there is a small cemetery to the left of the greenhouse complex where , who died in 1908, was entombed. It has a resemblance to a classical sarcophagus including a dolorous female figure base in marble. This figure symbolises science in mourning.

Also buried in the cemetery was African explorer and curator of the Botanical Garden  who died in 1925. The third tomb belongs to Adolf Engler (died 1930) and his wife Marie (died 1943). Engler was the first director of the Botanical Garden.

Botanical Garden publications 
The Botanical Garden together with the Botanical Museum publish two scientific journals: Willdenowia and Englera. In addition, Index Seminum and publications on the current operations and exposure of these facilities are published. In the nineteenth century  [Yearbook of the Royal Botanical Garden and the Botanical Museum in Berlin] was also published.

References

External links 

Official website 
Short overview 

Parks in Berlin
Tourist attractions in Berlin
Botanical gardens in Germany
Gardens in Berlin
Buildings and structures in Steglitz-Zehlendorf
Museums in Berlin
Natural history museums in Germany
Free University of Berlin